Erwin Ballabio (20 October 1918 – 4 March 2008) was a Swiss football goalkeeper. He played for FC Grenchen and the Swiss national team. Known as the "Black Panther" he kept goal for eight years for the Swiss team.

Early life
In 1941 Ballabio became the town of Grenchen's third policeman.

As a player

FC Grenchen
Ballabios was originally a youth player at FC Grenchen, and made his change to goalkeeper when 7–0 down playing for the youth team his manager placed the young defender in goal where he went on to save a penalty, starting his career as a keeper. He was called into the first team aged sixteen and enjoyed a long career as first choice keeper. His only football away from Grenchen was three seasons of vocational training, one at Lausanne Sports and the other two at FC Thun. He retired, becoming manager in 1956 to give younger keepers a chance. However, in 1959 he came out of a four-year retirement for one match, to replace Grenchen's injured first choice keeper in the Swiss Cup final against Servette.
He kept a clean sheet and Grenchen won the cup.

Switzerland
Ballabio's debut came in February 1939 against Portugal with his last match in June 1947. His total of 27 appearances for his country make him the third most capped keeper, which is a remarkable achievement considering the lack of fixtures due to World War II.

As a manager

FC Grenchen
Almost immediately after retiring as a player, Ballabio took charge of the FC Grenchen team. During his ten-year reign he took the team to their only Schweizer Cup win in 1959, and led them to a final defeat the following year. With Ballabio at the helm FC Grenchen recorded their best league performances finishing runner-up in 1959 and to third place in 1964.

Switzerland
Ballabio was appointed as national coach on 24 May 1967, replacing Alfredo Foni. In his first match, a Euro 1968 qualifier, his side recorded a 7–1 win against Romania, however they failed to qualify. He remained in charge for World Cup qualification but after a 1–1 draw with Portugal on 2 November 1969 meant they failed to qualify he was sacked.

Statistics

References

External links
 The Black Panther
 Der schwarze Panther im Tor

1918 births
1938 FIFA World Cup players
2008 deaths
FC Thun players
Association football goalkeepers
FC Lausanne-Sport players
Swiss football managers
Swiss men's footballers
Swiss police officers
Switzerland international footballers
Switzerland national football team managers
Sportspeople from the canton of Solothurn